Obrimus is a stick insect genus native to the Philippines. It is type genus for the tribe and the subfamily in which it is listed.

Characteristics 
The species of this genus correspond in the habitus to the other representatives of the Obrimini, appear somewhat longer-legged compared to these and also have longer antennae than these. Like almost all other Obrimini, they are wingless in either sex. They are similar in size and appearance to the species of the genera Brasidas. As with these, the females have a relatively long and straight ovipositor that surrounds the actual ovipositor. Most Obrimus species have more and more pointed spines, which, however, are often thinner than those of most other Obrimini species. Compared to the representatives of Brasidas and Euobrimus there are only poorly or partially barely recognizable, flat slits or pits and none holes at the outer edge of the metasternum.

The shape of the eggs also differs significantly from that of other genera. The micropylar plate has three arms and is located on the dorsal area, which is bulging. The egg shape is reminiscent of that of Sungaya eggs. However, behind the tip at the lower pole there is another blunt pole, so that the eggs below, more or less clearly recognizable, have two blunt ends. The lid (operculum) sits diagonally on the egg and falls off sharply to the ventral side.

Taxonomy 
The genus Obrimus was established in 1875 by Carl Stål. The generic name is borrowed from Greek mythology. As the only species, and thus type species, Stål named Obrimus bufo, which until then was listed in the genus Acanthoderus. Other species were later transferred to the genus or described in it. In the meantime most of them have been transferred to the younger genera Aretaon, Trachyaretaon, Brasidas and Euobrimus. Remaining in the genus are:

 Obrimus bicolanus Rehn, J. A. G. & Rehn, J. W. H., 1939
 Obrimus bufo (Westwood, 1848)
 Obrimus mesoplatus (Westwood, 1848)
 Obrimus uichancoi Rehn, J.A.G. & Rehn, J.W.H., 1939

Distribution 
Of the representatives known so far, only the occurrence of the two species described by Rehn and Rehn is known in more detail. Both appear on Luzon. While Obrimus bicolanus comes from the southeast of the island, more precisely from the Bicol region, Obrimus uichancoi was collected in the north in the province Apayao. Only the Philippines are given as location of the two other species.

Terraristic 
A single representative of the genus is currently in the terrariums of lovers. The stock goes back to specimens that Thierry Heitzmann collected in 2010 on Luzon and bred for the first time. The species was brought to Europe in 2011 by Bruno Kneubühler, also distributed as Obrimus sp. 'Pulog'. The Phasmid Study Group lists the species under the name Obrimus bicolanus (?) and PSG number 324.

References

External links 
 
 

Phasmatodea
Phasmatodea genera
Phasmatodea of Asia